Yashica was a Japanese manufacturer of cameras, originally active from 1949 until 2005 when its then-owner, Kyocera, ceased production.

In 2008, the Yashica name reappeared on cameras produced by the Hong Kong-based MF Jebsen Group. In 2015, trademark rights were transferred to Yashica International Company Limited and appointed 100 Enterprises International Group Co. Limited as Yashica Global Sole Agent.

History
The company began in December 1949 in Nagano, Japan, when the Yashima Seiki Company was founded with an initial investment of $566. Its eight employees originally manufactured components for electric clocks.  Later, they began making camera components, and by June 1953 had introduced their first complete camera, the Yashimaflex, a twin-lens reflex (TLR) medium-format camera designed for 6x6 cm medium format film. While the Yashimaflex used lenses labeled Tri-Lausar, successive models used Yashikor and Yashinon lenses.  All of these lenses were manufactured for Yashica by the Tomioka Optical Works, beginning a relationship that lasted for many years. Late in 1953, Yashima Seiki Company became Yashima Optical Industry Company, Ltd.

In 1957, Yashima founded Yashica, Inc., a subsidiary arm in New York City to manage marketing efforts in the United States.  1957 also marked the introduction of a popular new TLR camera series, the Yashica Mat line., as well as an 8mm cine movie camera. Yashima continued to grow, with 1,982 employees by 1958  when it changed its name to Yashica Company, Ltd, on acquiring the Nicca Camera Company, Ltd.  The Nicca acquisition was fortunate, as the designs acquired assisted Yashica in expanding its product line into advanced 35 mm rangefinder cameras.

The Yashica Pentamatic, an advanced, modern 35 mm Single Lens Reflex (SLR) camera with a proprietary bayonet-mount, automatic diaphragm (offered only with the Auto Yashinon 50mm/1.8 lens), and interchangeable lenses, was introduced in 1959.  As before, Yashica continued to source its lenses from the Tomioka Optical factory.

Around 1959–1960, Yashica acquired the assets of the bankrupt Zunow Optical Industry Co. Ltd.  Though a small company, Zunow had become known for limited production of a very advanced 35 mm SLR camera, along with several high-quality, fast 35 mm camera and 8mm cine (movie) lens designs and a proprietary bayonet-mount lens system similar to that of Yashica Pentamatic.  With the assistance of Tomioka Optical Works, Yashica adapted Zunow lens designs into its own 8mm turret cine (movie) cameras.

Like Zunow, Yashica found it difficult to gain market acceptance with its proprietary SLR lens mount, and redesigned its SLR camera line in 1962 to accept the Contax/Praktica M42 lens mount.  The new SLR camera was introduced as the Penta J.

In December 1965, Yashica introduced the world's first commercially successful electronically controlled 35 mm camera, the Yashica Electro 35, a popular rangefinder camera that in various model subvariants eventually sold 8 million units. The company continued to expand its international markets, and in August 1968, Yashica acquired its lens manufacturer, the Tomioka Optical and Machine Manufacturing Co., Ltd. (later renamed the Tomioka Optical Co. Ltd.).  By this time, Tomioka was one of the largest and most reputable lens manufacturers in Japan. Sales of 35 mm SLRs continued to grow steadily, and Yashica was quickly acquiring a reputation for both electronic camera expertise and high-quality optics. 1968 also marked the year of Yashica's last major TLR camera design, the Yashica Mat-124, a popular model which combined some of the best features of Yashica's earlier TLR cameras.

In 1968, Yashica introduced the TL Electro-X 35 mm single lens reflex (SLR) camera and produced it until 1974. It had a screw thread lens mount, the M42 lens mount, for its interchangeable lenses. It also had an all-electronic through-the-lens exposure meter in the viewfinder using lighted arrows (not true LEDs, which were first introduced with the Fujica ST801). The Copal Square SE shutter, a vertically-travelling metal blade focal plane shutter made by Copal Corporation, used in the camera, was electronically controlled.

In 1970, Yashica introduced their final TLR camera, the Yashica Mat-124G, perhaps the most evolved of the TLR variants.  Like several of the earlier versions it featured a built in light meter.  Settings to the shutter speed and aperture had to be made manually but it allowed the camera to be used without an additional handheld meter.  The 124G allowed conversion from 120 roll film to 220 roll film. Another improvement was the film advance lever, which now controlled both shutter and film advance.

In 1972, Yashica introduced the TL Electro 35 mm SLR camera which was similar to the Pentax Spotmatic camera made by the Asahi Optical Company (Pentax). The TL Electro also used a lighted exposure meter display similar to that in the TL Electro-X, as well as the M42 screw threaded lens mount for its interchangeable lenses.

In 1973, Yashica the company began Top Secret Project 130, a collaboration with Carl Zeiss that produced the RTS (for "Real Time System"), a new, professional 35 mm SLR with an electronically controlled shutter bearing the Contax brand.  A new prestige line of Yashica/Contax lenses designed by Carl Zeiss was introduced for the camera, with a common C/Y bayonet mount allowing lens interchange between all 35 mm Contax and Yashica SLR camera models. The F. Alexander Porsche Group was hired to complete an ergonomic and styling study of the new camera. The new Contax RTS appeared at photokina in 1974, and became a commercial success. Yashica soon introduced several new 35 mm SLR cameras beginning with the FX-1 (1975) and FX-2 (1976).  Also in that year, in response to the success of the Contax RTS, Yashica developed the upscale Yashica FR using some of the features of the RTS, including its electromagnetic shutter release.  The FR was capable of using the entire range of Carl Zeiss T* lenses. In contemporaneous tests, the FR was described as being tougher in some ways than the more expensive Contax RTS, including better sealing against dust and contaminants.  This practice of "pairing" similar Contax models with more affordable, less full-featured, but still high-quality Yashica models would continue for the next ten years. The FR was quickly followed in April 1977 by the FR-I and FR-II.  The FR-I was a 35 mm SLR offering even more features of the RTS, including an electronic shutter with both manual and aperture priority modes, and marked the high point for the Yashica brand in competing with Nikon, Canon, and Minolta for the semi-professional SLR camera market.

In 1979, Yashica introduced a new inexpensive 35 mm consumer SLR, the FX-3, intended for entry-level buyers.  Designed and manufactured to Yashica specifications by Cosina, the affordable FX-3 still incorporated the C/Y lens mount that would also accept Carl Zeiss T* lenses. This simple, lightweight manual-exposure SLR camera sold well, and with minor revisions, stayed in production until 2002.

In October 1983, Yashica Company Ltd. was acquired by ceramics giant Kyocera. Initially, the merger resulted in few outward changes. The manual-focus (MF) FX-103 Program, introduced in 1985, continued the "pairing" tradition of high-end Yashica SLR models with Contax (Contax 159 mm), and was the first Yashica SLR with TTL flash and full programmed exposure capabilities.

After 1983, all Yashica brand cameras were marketed by Kyocera (Kyoto Ceramics), which also made newer Contax cameras. By 1985, the company was facing intense market competition from other manufacturers, especially Minolta, which had introduced a competitively priced and advanced autofocus 35 mm SLR camera. Yashica eventually introduced its own autofocus 35 mm SLR camera line that was overpriced and poorly marketed in comparison to its competition. In response, Kyocera gradually repositioned the brand as a budget-priced point-and-shoot camera line, moving production from Japan to Hong Kong, and discontinued high-end SLR camera production.

In 2005, Kyocera halted production on all Contax, Yashica, and other Kyocera-branded film and digital cameras.

The New Yashica Corporation
In 2008, Kyocera sold the trademark rights of Yashica Inc. to Hong Kong-based MF Jebsen Group, and is under its subsidiary JNC Datum Tech International, Limited.  In late 2017, Yashica announced a digital camera, the Y35 DigiFilm camera, which raised $1.28 million on Kickstarter.  The Y35, styled to resemble the old Yashica Electro 35 film camera, incorporated 'digifilm' - interchangeable faux 35 film canisters that set a precise combination of ISO and size aspect ratios.  However, many owners reported multiple issues with design and functionality.

Yashica's products from JNC Datum Tech International have included digital cameras, digital camcoders, digital photo frames, portable DVD players, digital audio players, digital voice recorders, binoculars, mobile phones, SD cards, and 35mm films.

Camera models 1949-2005

TLRs

Pigeonflex (1953)
Yashimaflex (1953)
YashicaFlex (1953)
MolfoReflex (1953)
Yashicaflex A, AS I & II (1954)
Yashica C (1955)
Yashicaflex Rookie (1956)
Yashica B (1957)
Yashica LM (1957)
Yashica-Mat (1957)
Yashica A (1958),  D (1958)
Yashica 44 (1958)
Yashica-D (1958)
Yashica 635 (1958)
Yashica Auto (1959)
Yashica Mat LM (1959)
Yashica 44LM (1959)
Yashica 44A (1960)
Yashica Mat EM (1964)
Yashica E (1964) 
Yashica 24 (1965)
Yashica 12 (1967)
Yashica-Mat 124 (1968)
Yashica-Mat 124 G (1970)
Yashica-Mat 124 B (1975) (Brazil-only export variant of 124G, no exposure meter)

35 mm rangefinder

Electro 35
Electro 35 FC
Electro 35 CC
Electro 35 MC
Electro 35 CCN
Electro 35 GL
Electro 35 GS
Electro 35 GSN
Electro 35 GT
Electro 35 GTN
Electro 35 GX
Yashica 35
Yashica 35-f
Yashica minister iii
Yashica 35J
Yashica EE
Yashica Lynx
Yashica MG-1
Yashica Minimatic C
Yashica Minimatic S
Yashica Minimatic EL
Yashica Minister 700
Yashica Minister D
Yashica Campus

35 mm SLR cameras

 

Electro-AX
Electro-X
FFT
FR
FR-I
FR-II
FX-1
FX-2
FX-3
FX-3 Super
FX-3 Super 2000
FX-7
FX-7 Super YASHICA FX-7 SUPER
FX-8 (Only China)
FX-70
FX-80 (Only China)
FX-103
FX-800 Super (Only China)
FX-A (less than 1400 pieces Only US & Europe)
FX-D
FX-D SE
Penta J (and successors J-3, J-5, J-7 and J-P)
Pentamatic
Pentamatic II
TL-E
TL Electro
TL-Electro-X
TL Super
107MP/TR-7000/Revue AC-7/DAEWOO 107MP
108MP/Revue AC-8/YODOBASHI CAMERA (Japan Only)
109MP
200AF
210AF (Kyocera Brand Only)
230AF
270AF/230 Super
300AF
Dental Eye I
Dental Eye II
Dental Eye III/Medical Eye (Only Japan)

Compact 35 mm

Yashica AF-J
Yashica AF-J 2
Yashica AF-J 3
Yashica auto focus
Yashica auto focus motor
Yashica auto focus motor D
Yashica Auto Focus Motor II
Yashica LAF
Yashica Lynx
Yashica MF-2
Yashica MF-2 super
Yashica MF-3
Yashica MF-3 super
Yashica 35-ME 
Yashica 35-MF
Yashica 35-MC
Yashica MG-2 AutoFlash
Yashica Motor J
Yashica Partner
Yashica Partner AF
Yashica T
Yashica T-Zoom / T4 Zoom / Kyocera T-Zoom
Yashica T2 / Kyocera T
Yashica T3 / Kyocera T Scope
Yashica T3 Super / Kyocera T Scope2
Yashica T4 / T4 (Safari Edition)
Yashica T4D / Kyocera Slim T / Slim T (Safari Edition)
Yashica T4 Super / T5 
Yashica T4 Super D / T5D / Kyocera T 
Yashica Kyocera EZ Junior

Compact Digital
Kyocera DA-1 (1996)
Yashica KC-350(1997)
Yashica KC-600(1997)
Kyocera VP-110 CMOS Camera(1997)
Yashica Samurai 1300DG (1998)
Yashica Samurai 2100DG (1999)

Super 8mm movie camera
 Yashica Super YXL-1,1
 Yashica Super YXL-100
 Yashica Super-40k
 Yashica Super-50
 Yashica U-Matic Super 8
 Yashica Nicca Super 30 Electronic
 Yashica Super 8 10
 Yashica Super-800 Electro

Post-2005 Camera Models

MF-1
MF-2
Yashica Y35

References

Sources

External links

 Yashica Electro 35 & Classic Rangefinder site
 Yashica Rangefinder Camera Resource site
 Yashica Cameras Price Guide – completed auction prices.
 Yashica's current website
 Yashica TLR Site
 Yashica Unveils Three Cameras and Two New Negative Rolls

 
Defunct manufacturing companies of Japan
Defunct defense companies of Japan
Photography companies of Japan
Japanese brands
1949 establishments in Japan
1983 mergers and acquisitions